Igor Zhovkva (born 22 October 1979, Kyiv) is a Ukrainian politician and diplomat. Deputy Head of the Office of the President of Ukraine.

Career 
Since September 2014, he has been the head of the Main Department for Foreign Policy and European Integration of the Administration of the President of Ukraine.

He is a member of the National Investment Council (since December 24, 2019).

Zhovkva is a member of the National Reform Council (since January 29, 2021).

References 

Living people
1979 births
Politicians from Kyiv
Ukrainian diplomats
21st-century Ukrainian politicians

uk:Жовква Ігор Іванович